Synucleins are a family of soluble proteins common to vertebrates, primarily expressed in neural tissue and in certain tumors.

The name is a blend of the words "synapse" and "nucleus", as it was first found in the synapses in the electromotor nucleus of the electric ray.

Family members 

The synuclein family  includes three known proteins: alpha-synuclein, beta-synuclein, and gamma-synuclein. Interest in the synuclein family began when alpha-synuclein was found to be mutated in several families with autosomal dominant Parkinson's disease.

All synucleins have in common a highly conserved alpha-helical lipid-binding motif with similarity to the class-A2 lipid-binding domains of the exchangeable apolipoproteins. Synuclein family members are not found outside vertebrates, although they have some conserved structural similarity with plant 'late-embryo-abundant' proteins.

Alpha-synuclein 
Beta-synuclein 
Gamma-synuclein

Function 

Normal cellular functions have not been determined for any of the synuclein proteins. Some data suggest a role in the regulation of membrane stability and/or turnover. Mutations in alpha-synuclein are associated with early-onset familial Parkinson's disease and the protein aggregates abnormally in Parkinson's disease, Lewy body disease, and other neurodegenerative diseases.  The gamma-synuclein protein's expression in breast tumors is a marker for tumor progression.

Human proteins containing this domain 
SNCA;      SNCB;      SNCG;

References

External links
 

Protein domains
Protein families
Peripheral membrane proteins
Neuropathology